Epsilon-sarcoglycan is a protein that in humans is encoded by the SGCE gene.

The SGCE gene encodes the epsilon member of the sarcoglycan family, transmembrane components of the dystrophin-glycoprotein complex, which links the cytoskeleton to the extracellular matrix.[supplied by OMIM]

See also
 Myoclonic dystonia

References

Further reading

External links
  GeneReviews/NIH/NCBI/UW entry on Myoclonus-Dystonia
 LOVD mutation database: SGCE